Bikash Debbarma is an Indian politician from Tripura. He is currently serving as Minister of Tribal Welfare, Handloom, Handicrafts and Sericulture and Statistics in Government of Tripura under Second Saha Ministry. He became the MLA from Krishnapur Assembly constituency by defeating Mahendra Debbarma of Tipra Motha Party by a margin of 2,638 votes in 2023. He was also a BJP's Janajati Morcha President in Tripura.

References 

Living people
Tripura MLAs 2023–2028
State cabinet ministers of Tripura
Bharatiya Janata Party
Bharatiya Janata Party politicians from Tripura
Tripura politicians